Gaurotes tuberculicollis is a species of beetle in the family Cerambycidae. It was described by Blanchard in 1871.

References

Lepturinae
Beetles described in 1871